A qutrit (or quantum trit) is a unit of quantum information that is realized by a 3-level quantum system, that may be in a superposition of three mutually orthogonal quantum states.

The qutrit is analogous to the classical radix-3 trit, just as the qubit, a quantum system described by a superposition of two orthogonal states, is analogous to the classical radix-2 bit.

There is ongoing work to develop quantum computers using qutrits and qubits with multiple states.

Representation
These are used to describe the qutrit as a superposition state vector in the form of a linear combination of the three orthonormal basis states:
,
where the coefficients are complex probability amplitudes, such that the sum of their squares is unity (normalization):
 

The qubit's orthonormal basis states  span the two-dimensional complex Hilbert space , corresponding to spin-up and spin-down of a spin-1/2 particle. Qutrits require a Hilbert space of higher dimension, namely the three-dimensional  spanned by the qutrit's basis , which can be realized by a three-level quantum system.

An n-qutrit register can represent 3n different states simultaneously, i.e., a superposition state vector in 3n-dimensional complex Hilbert space.

Qutrits have several peculiar features when used for storing quantum information. For example, they are more robust to decoherence under certain environmental interactions. In reality, manipulating qutrits directly might be tricky, and one way to do that is by using an entanglement with a qubit.

Qutrit quantum gates
The quantum logic gates operating on single qutrits are  unitary matrices and gates that act on registers of  qutrits are  unitary matrices (the elements of the unitary groups U(3) and U(3n) respectively).

The Lie algebra of the matrix exponential is provided here. The same rotation operators are used for gluon interactions, where the three basis states are the three colors  of the strong interaction.

The global phase shift gate for the qutrit is  where the phase factor  is called the global phase.

This phase gate performs the mapping  and together with the 8 rotation operators is capable of expressing any single-qutrit gate in U(3), as a series circuit of at most 9 gates.

See also
 Gell-Mann matrices
 Generalizations of Pauli matrices
 Mutually unbiased bases
 Quantum computing
 Radix economy
 Ternary computing

Notes

References

External links

 

Units of information
Quantum information science
Quantum computing
Ternary computers